Atmalı is a village in the Besni District, Adıyaman Province, Turkey. The village is populated by Kurds and had a population population of 1,692 in 2021.

The hamlet of Akkuyu is attached to the village.

References

Villages in Besni District
Kurdish settlements in Adıyaman Province